Wiltwyck Rural Cemetery, also known simply as Wiltwyck Cemetery, is a cemetery in Kingston, New York. It takes its name from the Dutch settlement Wiltwyck, later renamed Kingston by British officials.
 Wiltwyck Cemetery was first organized in 1850, and reorganized in 1856.

Background
Some notable figures interred in Wiltwyck Cemetery include the Neoclassicist painter, John Vanderlyn, World War II Congressional Medal of Honor winner Robert H. Dietz, and one-time Presidential Candidate running against Theodore Roosevelt, Alton Brooks Parker.

References

External links

 
Cemeteries in Ulster County, New York
Kingston, New York